Nordgulen is a fjord in Bremanger Municipality in Vestland county, Norway. It is a branch off the main Gulen fjord. The river Svelgen is one of the primary inflows into the Nordgulen fjord. The village of Svelgen is located at the end of the Nordgulen fjord. There are settlements all around the fjord, and roads along the coast around the entire fjord.

References

Fjords of Vestland
Bremanger